Presidential elections were held in Palau on 28 August 1985 to elect a President and Vice-President, following the assassination of Haruo Remeliik on 30 June. Lazarus Salii won the election for President, defeating interim President Alfonso Oiterong, whilst Thomas Remengesau, Sr. was elected Vice-President. Voter turnout was 79.1%.

Results

President

Vice-President

References

Palau
Presidential
Presidential elections in Palau
Non-partisan elections